The Jorge Millas Award was instituted in 1996 to remember the work of the distinguished intellectual  (1917–1982), an academic at the University of Chile and dean of the Faculty of Philosophy and Social Sciences of the Austral University of Chile.

The recognition consists of an economic stimulus, a commemorative medal with the effigy of the philosopher, and an official diploma.

It is given by the Austral University of Chile on a biennial basis.

For the 2010 edition, the jury was made up of the 2008 winner, the former rector of the University of Chile, the former rector of the Pontifical Catholic University of Valparaíso, Alfonso Muga, and the rector of the Austral University, Víctor Cubillos.

Awardees
1996: Humberto Giannini
1998: Agustín Squella
2000: Fernando Oyarzun Peña
2002: Italo Caorsi Chouquer
2004: Luis Eduardo González Fiegehen
2006: Carla Cordua
2008: 
2010: 
2012: Humberto Giannini
2014: Pablo Oyarzún
2016: Francisco Javier Gil

References

External links
  

1996 establishments in Chile
Academic awards
Awards established in 1996
Chilean awards
Austral University of Chile